Cules can refer to:
 Cambridge University Light Entertainment Society
 Supporters of FC Barcelona